Eliason Glacier is a glacier  long close west of Mount Hornsby, flowing south from Detroit Plateau into the ice piedmont north of Larsen Inlet, Nordenskjöld Coast in northern Graham Land, Antarctica. It was mapped from surveys by the Falkland Islands Dependencies Survey (1960–61), and was named by the UK Antarctic Place-Names Committee after the Eliason motor sledge, invented in 1942 in Sweden, now made in Canada, and used in Arctic Canada since 1950 and in the Antarctic since 1960.

References

 SCAR Composite Antarctic Gazetteer.

Glaciers of Nordenskjöld Coast